The Probation of Offenders Act 1907 (7 Edw. 7 c. 17) is an Act of the United Kingdom Parliament, commonly referred to as just the Probation Act.

Enactment
The Act was passed on 21 August and originally extended throughout the United Kingdom of Great Britain and Ireland. It remains in force in the Republic of Ireland.

Summary
The Act allows judges wide latitude to dismiss a charge tried summarily against a defendant even when the court thinks it is proved, or to conditionally discharge a defendant (whether the charge is tried summarily or on indictment). The power may be invoked when the court is of the opinion that

In practice, cases may be dismissed under the Probation Act for a defendant on condition that he pays a contribution to charity, or repays an amount stolen, or pays the costs arising from his actions. They may also be dismissed where the offence is technical or trivial. The application of the Act has occasionally caused controversy where victims or persons affected by the crime feel that the dismissal is inappropriate.

Despite the name, a dismissal under the Probation Act does not put the offender on probation in the sense of having to report to and engage with a probation officer, unless it is expressed to do so. Indeed, if a defendant is "given the Probation Act", it does not count as a criminal conviction, although it has been known to negatively affect travel abroad.

External links
Probation of Offenders Act, 1907

References

Parole
United Kingdom Acts of Parliament 1907
Criminal law of the United Kingdom
Probation